Cowtown Speedway was a  high bank clay track automobile  raceway in Kennedale, Texas  that hosted weekend races for classes such as  Dwarf cars,  Sprint cars,  stock cars and  go-karts.

Touring Series
The POWRi Midget Racing National Tour was scheduled to hold their first race in Texas to open their 2012 season at Cowtown but it was postponed. The United States Modified Touring Series (USMTS) held a Southern Tour in May 2008; local drivers were the top three finishers.

References

External links
Cowtown Speedway home page

Sports venues in Texas